Xalqobod (formerly Komsomolabad) is an urban-type settlement in Surxondaryo Region, Uzbekistan. It is the administrative center of Muzrabot District. Its population was 7,515 people in 1989, and 9,200 in 2016.

References

Populated places in Surxondaryo Region
Urban-type settlements in Uzbekistan